Otia Dadiani (died 1757), of the House of Dadiani, was Prince of Mingrelia from 1728 until his death. Like his predecessors, Otia Dadiani was embroiled in a series of civil wars that plagued western Georgia. He spent years fighting King Alexander V of Imereti with varying fortune. In the last years of his rule, Otia reconciled and corroborated with the Imeretian monarchy.

Accession 
Otia was the eldest son of Bezhan Dadiani, Prince of Mingrelia, by his wife Tamar Gelovani. In 1728, Otia accompanied Bezhan to a rendezvous with an Ottoman representative at Geguti in Imereti, where the Dadiani fell into a trap set up by the Imeretian nobleman Zurab Abashidze. Bezhan was killed by the Turkish dignitary's entourage, but Otia escaped and succeeded his father as Prince of Mingrelia, but not without a conflict with his younger brother Katso whom he had captured and sent for imprisonment in Racha, at the castle of Kvara.  

Dadiani saw this campaign, which inevitably involved his possessions, as an attack against Mingrelia's interests. Alexander belatedly realized that his decision threatened his security and withdrew his troops from Abkhazia, but Otia began to plot revenge.

Wars in Imereti 
In December 1732, Otia made a common cause with the Abashidze family and duke of Racha in an attempt to bring down Alexander in favor of the king's brother Mamuka. They blockaded the Imeretian capital Kutaisi, but did not dare to attack the citadel for fear of Ottoman reaction and withdrew. Their renewed offensive was dashed by the royal army at the battle of Chikhori at which Otia was wounded and made prisoner, and his brother Katsia was killed. Alexander tried reconciliation and, while helping the captive adversary to recover his health, offered him the governorship of Lechkhumi. However, the Ottomans, fearful of an emerging alliance, compelled Alexander to restore Otia to Mingrelia. 

The conflict between the two rulers resumed as Prince Zurab Abashidze embroiled the duke of Racha and Otia Dadiani in another conspiracy. Forewarned, Alexander hired Lesgian tribesmen and ravaged his enemies's lands. Dadiani and Abashidze retaliated in 1740 and with the help of the Abkhaz mercenaries burned down the royal palace at Vartsikhe.  Otia subsequently made peace with Alexander and maintained good relations with the king's successor, Solomon I of Imereti, who married Otia's daughter Mariam. In 1757, the seasoned prince Otia sent his son Katsia with an Mingrelian army to the aid of Solomon I, who won a decisive victory over invading Ottoman troops and their local allies at the battle of Khresili.

Family 
Otia Dadiani was married to Gulkan, daughter of Shoshita III, Duke of Racha. His children were:

 Katsia II Dadiani (died 1788), Prince of Mingrelia; 
 Prince Nikoloz Dadiani;
 Prince Giorgi Dadiani (died 15 December 1799), whose son was Niko "the Great" Dadiani (1768–1834), sometime regent of Mingrelia, general, and historian;
 Prince Anton (died 1815), a religious writer and bishop of Tsageri (1760–1777) and of Chqondidi (1777–1789);
 Princess Mariam (died 1778), wife of King Solomon I of Imereti.

Notes

References 
 
 
 

1757 deaths
House of Dadiani
18th-century people from Georgia (country)